Acupalpus dimidiatus is an insect-eating ground beetle of the genus Acupalpus.

dimidiatus
Beetles described in 1838